Sagardeep Kaur (24 September 1981 – 23 November 2016) was an Indian athlete who won a gold medal in the women's 4x400 metres relay in the 2002 Asian Athletics Championships. Competing at the 2003 World Championships, the Indian team in the 4 × 400 metres relay was knocked out after the initial heat, where they finished a distant last.

Her personal best time in the 400 metres was 52.50 seconds, achieved in June 2004 in Chennai.

On 23 November 2016, she died in a road accident near Guhla, in the Kaithal district of Haryana. At the time of her death, she was a sub-inspector in the Punjab Police and had two daughters Neerat Singh,Avneet Singh with husband Satnam Singh athletics coach.

References

1981 births
2016 deaths
Indian female sprinters
World Athletics Championships athletes for India